Ergobrotis was a town of ancient Galatia, inhabited during Byzantine times. Its name does not occur among ancient authors, but is inferred from epigraphic and other evidence.

Its site is located near Tiske, Asiatic Turkey.

References

Populated places in ancient Galatia
Former populated places in Turkey
Populated places of the Byzantine Empire
History of Ankara Province